United Nations Security Council Resolution 2029 was unanimously adopted on 21 December 2011, after recalling resolution 2013. The Security Council on this morning extended the terms of office of four judges of the Trial Chamber until 30 June 2012 or sooner if their trials were completed.

See also 
List of United Nations Security Council Resolutions 2001 to 2100

References

External links
Text of the Resolution at undocs.org

 2029
2011 in Rwanda
 2029
December 2011 events